"Without Love" is a song by Nick Lowe from his 1979 studio album Labour of Lust.

Johnny Cash version 

Johhny Cash covered the song on his 1980 studio album Rockabilly Blues. Nick Lowe himself produced the recording and played on it together with Dave Edmunds.

Released in January 1981 as a single (Columbia 11-11424, with "It Ain't Nothing New Babe" on the opposite side), Cash's version reached number 78 on U.S. Billboard country chart for the week of February 14, 1981.

Track listing

Charts

References

External links 
 "Without Love" on the Johnny Cash official website

Nick Lowe songs
Johnny Cash songs
1979 songs
1981 singles
Songs written by Nick Lowe
Song recordings produced by Nick Lowe
Columbia Records singles